Abdul Razack (1888 – July 1946) was a Trinidadian cricketer. He played in one first-class match for Trinidad and Tobago in 1923/24.

See also
 List of Trinidadian representative cricketers

References

External links
 

1888 births
1946 deaths
Trinidad and Tobago cricketers